The term Napierian logarithm or Naperian logarithm, named after John Napier, is often used to mean the natural logarithm. Napier did not introduce this natural logarithmic function, although it is named after him. 
However, if it is taken to mean the "logarithms" as originally produced by Napier, it is a function given by (in terms of the modern natural logarithm): 
 

The Napierian logarithm satisfies identities quite similar to the modern logarithm, such as
 
or

In Napier's 1614 Mirifici Logarithmorum Canonis Descriptio, he provides tables of logarithms of sines for 0 to 90°, where the values given (columns 3 and 5) are

Properties 

Napier's "logarithm" is related to the natural logarithm by the relation

 

and to the common logarithm by

 

Note that

 

and

 

Napierian logarithms are essentially natural logarithms with decimal points shifted 7 places rightward and with sign reversed. For instance the logarithmic values

would have the corresponding Napierian logarithms:

For further detail, see history of logarithms.

References

.
.
.

External links
 Denis Roegel (2012) Napier’s Ideal Construction of the Logarithms, from the Loria Collection of Mathematical Tables.

Logarithms